Sarah Lee Lippincott (October 26, 1920 – February 28, 2019), also known as Sarah Lee Lippincott Zimmerman, was an American astronomer. She was professor emerita of astronomy at Swarthmore College and director emerita of the college's Sproul Observatory.
 She was a pioneer in the use of astrometry to determine the character of binary stars and search for extrasolar planets.

Education
Lippincott received a Bachelor of Arts degree from the University of Pennsylvania in 1941 and an Master of Arts from Swarthmore College in 1942.

Life
Lippincott was born in 1920 and attended college at the University of Pennsylvania College for Women in the 1940s, where she played on the women's basketball team.

After graduation from the University of Pennsylvania, Lippincott attended Swarthmore College, where she worked closely with Peter van de Kamp on many astrometry projects between 1945 and his retirement in 1972, when she became observatory director. She wrote his obituary when he died in 1995.

She was the third wife of the late Dave Garroway, the founding host of NBC's Today show. Garroway had an active interest in astronomy, and they met on a tour of observatories in the Soviet Union that she was hosting. After Garroway's death by suicide at their home in 1982, she helped establish the Dave Garroway Laboratory for the Study of Depression at the University of Pennsylvania.

She conducted numerous astrometric studies of nearby stars with van de Kamp in the search for extrasolar planets. She reported the discovery of several objects of substellar mass and proposed a 0.01 solar-mass planetary companion to the star Lalande 21185 in 1951. The same proposal of planetary objects was made for a number of other stars, as well. Claims for the smaller planetary objects were never confirmed and gradually have become discredited. However, she was quite successful in using the same techniques for characterizing many binary star systems. Her 1951 calculations of the orbit of the difficult astronomical binary star system  Ross 614 were used to successfully find and image the system's secondary star. These calculations were used by Walter Baade to find and optically resolve this binary system for the first time using the then new  Hale Telescope at the Palomar Observatory in California.

She is listed as professor emerita of astronomy and director emerita of the Sproul Observatory in the 2010 Swarthmore college catalog. She last published astronomy research papers in 1983. In 2009, she attended the dedication ceremony for the new Peter van de Kamp observatory at Swarthmore College.

Lippincott died on February 28, 2019, in Kendal Longwood.

Honors and awards
In 1966, she received the Kappa Kappa Gamma Alumnae Achievement Award.

In 1973, she was awarded an honorary doctor of science by Villanova University.

In 1976, she was elected to the Distinguished Daughters of Pennsylvania (as Mrs. Christian Zimmerman).

Sample publications

Books
Lippincott authored two books, with coauthors:
Philadelphia: The Unexpected City; with Laurence Lafore; Publisher: Doubleday & Co.; 1st edition (January 1, 1965); ASIN: B002LQQJR4
Point to the Stars - Revised Edition; with Joseph Maron Joseph; Publisher: McGraw-Hill Book Company (1967); ASIN: B002BG231A

Papers
Lippincott published over one hundred papers in her career. These are two typical examples:
A determination of the parallax and mass-ratio of 6 Equulei by van de Kamp, Peter and Lippincott, Sarah Lee, Astronomical Journal, Volume 51, Page 162 (1945)
An unseen companion to 36 Ursae Majoris A from analysis of plates taken with the Sproul 61-CM refractor by Lippincott, S. L.  Astronomical Society of the Pacific, Publications, Volume 95, Pages 775-777 (1983)

References

External links
1975 Swarthmore College faculty photograph
Swarthmore College, Faculty and Instructional Staff - Emeriti
Women in Astronomy: A Comprehensive Bibliography
"SAO/NASA Astrophysics Data System" Bibliography
Sarah Lee Lippincott Zimmerman, directory page at the IAU

1920 births
2019 deaths
American women astronomers
20th-century American astronomers
21st-century American astronomers
Swarthmore College faculty
Scientists from Philadelphia
20th-century American women scientists
21st-century American women scientists
American women academics